In representation theory, a subrepresentation of a representation  of a group G is a representation  such that W is a vector subspace of V and .

A nonzero finite-dimensional representation always contains a nonzero subrepresentation that is irreducible, the fact seen by induction on dimension. This fact is generally false for infinite-dimensional representations.

If  is a representation of G, then there is the trivial subrepresentation:

References 

Representation theory